James Sherry (born 14 November 1967) is an Australian television presenter, actor, and producer.

Career 
Sherry has hosted several children's shows, including Saturday Disney (1990 to 1994) and A*mazing (1994 to 1998). He has had guest roles in television dramas, including Spellbinder in 1995, The Man From Snowy River in 1996, Blue Heelers in 1999, McLeod's Daughters in 2002, and The Odyssey. He almost became host of the 2003 revival of Australia's version of The Price is Right, but the Nine Network informed him that Larry Emdur (who had hosted the 1993–1998 version) would host.

Sherry is also an announcer at international cricket matches in Australia and used to regularly host Saturday Lotto, Oz Lotto and Powerball draws.

Sherry is an MC at Australian Football League games held at Docklands Stadium and the Melbourne Cricket Ground; he always wears the colours of the home team. In recent years, however, he has focused on production work.

Sherry has produced the "Open Drive" segment on broadcasts of the Australian Open tennis.

In March 2020, Sherry was a contestant on ABC's Hard Quiz, hosted by Tom Gleeson. His chosen expert topic was 1990s Disney Cartoons. He was runner-up to an expert on Nirvana lead singer Kurt Cobain.

References

External links
Claud's Agency website

1967 births
Australian male television actors
Australian game show hosts
Australian children's television presenters
Living people